Lightning was a German Shepherd from a line of canine silent film stars.  A grandson of Strongheart, Lightning was billed as "The Wonder Dog" and "The Marvel Dog".  He began life as a runt but grew to be larger than average for the breed, and he was very intelligent. Lightning appeared in numerous movies.

Select filmography

Gallery

References

German shepherds
Dog actors